The 2008 Greenlandic local elections saw the governing Siumut win the most votes and seats.

Results

References

Local elections in Greenland
2008 in Greenland